Tvedestrandsposten is a local newspaper published in Tvedestrand, Norway. It was established in 1872 by Arne Garborg.

It has a circulation of 3522, of whom 3383 are subscribers.

Tvedestrandsposten is published by Tvedestrand & Risør Holding AS, which is owned 75% by Østlands-Posten, which in turn is owned 100% by A-pressen.

References 
 Norwegian Media Registry

External links
 Website

Publications established in 1872
Daily newspapers published in Norway
Mass media in Aust-Agder
Amedia
1872 establishments in Norway